Golden Globe Award for Best Supporting Actor may refer to:

Golden Globe Award for Best Supporting Actor – Motion Picture
Golden Globe Award for Best Supporting Actor – Series, Miniseries or Television Film